The Army Science Board (ASB) provides advice about army science to senior military leaders.  The ASB is a Federal Advisory Committee organized under the Federal Advisory Committee Act. It is the United States Department of the Army senior scientific advisory body that was chartered in 1977 to replace the Army Scientific Advisory Panel. The ASB provides the Army with independent advice and recommendations on matters relating to the Army's scientific, technological, manufacturing, logistics and business management functions, as well as other matters the Secretary of the Army deems important to the Department of the Army.   The Secretary of the Army delegates oversight authority to the Deputy Under Secretary of the Army, who appoints the ASB Executive Director. Terms are generally three years. 

The ASB is composed of distinguished individuals from the private sector, academia, non-DoD government agencies, and former senior military officers. Members are selected according to their preeminence in their respective fields, and are appointed to serve renewable three-year terms by the Secretary of the Army. Membership is carefully monitored to ensure that diverse disciplines and points of view are represented. The Secretary of the Army appoints the chair and vice chair from within the ASB membership. The ASB Chair also serves as a non-voting observer to the Defense Science Board. ASB membership is augmented by a small number of consultants who are appointed to provide specialized expertise for ASB studies. The board is composed of 20 voting and 20 non-voting members, each serving three-year terms, and consultants who serve one-year terms.

History

The Army Science Board (ASB) has served as the Army's senior scientific advisory board. When it was chartered as a Federal Advisory Committee under the Federal Advisory Committee Act in 1977, the ASB replaced the Army Scientific Advisory Panel (ASAP). Both the ASAP and the ASB grew out of the need for Army-specific guidance on scientific research and development (R&D) and the Army's desire to maintain its strong technical advantage over other nations. 

From the founding of the Army through the early 1900s, the Army did not have an effective R&D program — production and procurement were emphasized and the R&D during this era was limited to product improvement. Prior to World War II, the Army's R&D was controlled through the G-4 as a function of the supply arms and services. In October 1943, Secretary of War Henry Stimson indicated that he wanted scientific help in the war effort, resulting in the R&D branch's reorganization and its elevation to division level in May 1944. This elevation eliminated obstacles related to recruiting and retaining enough qualified scientific people, and provided them the clout to effectively perform their duties.

Following World War II, despite General Dwight D. Eisenhower’s warnings that using scientific and technological resources solely for procurement purposes limited the usefulness of those resources and indications that separating R&D from procurement and production would benefit the military, concerns remained that the senior Army leadership lacked the vision to effectively guide the direction of R&D programs. However, funding and personnel limitations continued to direct R&D toward the necessary areas of procurement and production. A few years later, Dr. Donald Loughridge, the Army's Senior Scientific Advisor, was concerned that the Army lacked an effective basic research program, resulting in its inability to attract desirable entry-level scientists to its laboratories. By April 1950, Secretary of the Army Gordon Gray was also concerned with the Army's R&D program and its ability to support warfighters in future wars. He did not believe that the United States could fight a war based solely upon soldiers, especially with the fall of China to communism. 

Shortly thereafter, Gray's replacement, Secretary of the Army Frank Pace, evaluated the existing Army R&D program, which was then engaged in supporting the Korean War. In January 1951, the evaluators recommended that a research advisory board be established to assist the Secretary of the Army in R&D matters. Based on this report, General Joseph Collins, Army Chief of Staff, recommended establishing an Army Scientific Advisory Committee as this research advisory board. By March, Pace approved establishing this board in principle and in November he took the first steps to obtain this scientific advice. Without formally establishing a committee, the secretary appointed 10 outstanding scientists and industrialists as his scientific advisers. These pioneer advisers were: 

 Dr. Detlev Bronk, National Academy of Sciences President, 1950 to 1962, and Johns Hopkins University President, 1949 to 1953. He was credited with formulating the modern theory of biophysics. 
 Mr. Crawford Greenewalt, DuPont President, 1948 to 1962. He was instrumental in transforming the theoretical work into a production system capable of manufacturing sufficient plutonium for the Manhattan Project. 
 Mr. Robert Haslam, consultant and as Chief of Division 3, Rocket Ordnance Research, National Defense Research Committee. 
 Mr. Kaufman Keller, Chrysle board of directors member of W.R. Grace & Co.; retired Standard Oil Co. Vice President. Previously, he was a professor of chemical engineering at the Massachusetts Institute of Technology (MIT). 
 Dr. Frederick Hovde, Purdue University president, 1946 to 1971. During World War II, he was chairman of the board, 1950 to 1956; Chrysler President, 1935 to 1950. 
 Dr. James R. Killian Jr., MIT president, 1948 to 1959; MIT Corp. Chairman, 1959 to 1971. Following his service on this board, he became the presidential science advisor to President Dwight D. Eisenhower from 1957 to 1959. 
 Dr. Charles Lauritsen, Danish-born physicist and professor of electrical and radio engineering at the California Institute of Technology, 1911 to 1962. During World War II, his nuclear physics research was instrumental in the Manhattan Project. 
 Dr. Murrough O'Brien, University of California's College of Engineering dean, 1943 to 1959. Previously, he was the university's mechanical engineering department chair, 1937 to 1943. 
 Dr. William Shockley, Bell Telephone Laboratories Research Physicist, 1945 to 1954. During World War II, he was the Anti-Submarine Warfare Operations Research Group research director. He received the Nobel Prize in physics in 1956 for his role in developing the transistor. 
 Mr. William Webster, New England Electric System Executive Vice President and director. Following World War II, he was deputy to the Secretary of Defense on Atomic Energy and the chairman of the Military Liaison Committee to the Atomic Energy Commission. In 1950, he was the DOD R&D Board chairman.

Following the Korean War, the Advisory Committee on Army Organization analyzed the Army's organization with respect to its ability to support the nation in times of war and peace. This committee praised the scientific advisory group's creation, indicating it was a significant step in bringing the best scientific ability and experience to the Army. In 1954, the House Committee on Government Operations issued a report stating that the Army's scientific advisory group was not being used effectively. Army Secretary Robert T. Stevens, Pace's successor, concurred with these recommendations and established plans to formalize the ASAP with a permanent charter, enlarge its membership and give it more latitude in its efforts. 

The ASAP — then with 25 members — held its first meeting November 16–17, 1954. During the meeting, the panel heard briefings on various areas involving the Army's R&D efforts. By 1958, the panel grew to 70 members and divided itself into eight different subpanels: 

 Air Mobility 
 Chemical, Biological and Radiological Warfare 
 Communications and Electronics 
 Firepower 
 Environmental Research 
 Human Factors 
 Surface Mobility 
 Research Organization and Planning

The ASB's distinguished members also include two astronauts, three Olympians (one with a silver medal in the long jump), one U.S. Ambassador to France and a member of the first expedition team to ascend Mount Minya Konka in Eastern Tibet, China.

Past chairs

Past executive directors

References

Sources

External links
 Defense Science Board Website at the Defense Acquisition, Technology, & Logistics website.
 Army Science Board Chairs (Army AL&T Magazine Website)
 Army Science Board Vice-Chairs (Army AL&T Magazine Website)
Army Science Board Executive Secretaries (Army AL&T Magazine Website) 
 Army Science Board Photos (Army AL&T Magazine Website)

United States Department of Defense agencies
United States Army organization